Matatia Paama (born 3 October 1992) is a Tahitian footballer who plays as a defender for A.S. Central Sport in the Tahiti Ligue 1.

References

1992 births
Living people
French Polynesian footballers
Association football defenders
Tahiti international footballers
2016 OFC Nations Cup players